George Albert Hedley (20 July 1876 –  16 August 1942) was a professional footballer who won the 1902 and 1908 FA Cup finals with Sheffield United and Wolverhampton Wanderers respectively, scoring in both.

He was born in South Bank, Middlesbrough.

Between 1903 and 1906 he was with Southern League Southampton, where he was top scorer in 1904-05 (jointly with Edgar Bluff) with ten league goals. Hedley made one appearance for England, scoring against Ireland in the 1901-02 British Home Championship.

He was also manager at Bristol City from 1913 to 1915, later becoming a publican in Bristol.

Honours
Sheffield United
Football League Division One runner-up: 1899–1900
 FA Cup winner: 1899, 1902
 FA Cup finalist: 1901

Southampton
Southern League championship: 1903–04

Wolverhampton Wanderers
 FA Cup winner: 1908

References

External links

1876 births
1942 deaths
People from South Bank, Redcar and Cleveland
English footballers
England international footballers
Southern Football League players
Sheffield United F.C. players
Southampton F.C. players
Wolverhampton Wanderers F.C. players
Bristol City F.C. managers
English Football League representative players
Footballers from Yorkshire
Association football forwards
English football managers
FA Cup Final players